Ayhan Taşkın (born 1953) is a Turkish wrestler. He won a bronze medal in the Super Heavyweight class in Freestyle wrestling at the 1984 Summer Olympics in Los Angeles.

References

External links
 

1953 births
Living people
Olympic wrestlers of Turkey
Wrestlers at the 1984 Summer Olympics
Turkish male sport wrestlers
Olympic bronze medalists for Turkey
Olympic medalists in wrestling
Medalists at the 1984 Summer Olympics
Mediterranean Games gold medalists for Turkey
Mediterranean Games silver medalists for Turkey
Mediterranean Games medalists in wrestling
Competitors at the 1975 Mediterranean Games
Competitors at the 1987 Mediterranean Games
20th-century Turkish people
21st-century Turkish people